Mockingbird (2005) is the third solo studio album from singer-songwriter Derek Webb.

Produced by Cason Cooley, the album touches on subjects such as politics, social justice, and war. Webb has stated that he tackled these subjects to stimulate discussion and engage people to bring about changes in what he sees as some of the greatest problems the world is facing today.
The Work of the People (a community of artists, storytellers, filmmakers, poets and theologians) created a music video for Webb's song A New Law which is available for viewing on their website.

To broaden this discussion to people less inclined to purchase his album, beginning September 1, 2006, Webb offered Mockingbird for free on the website www.freederekwebb.com, where it was available for download until December 8, 2006. Over 80,000 free copies of the album were downloaded during this time.

Track listing

Personnel

Band
Derek Webb – vocals, acoustic guitar, bells (tracks 3, 5, 8, 10), Mellotron (track 7)
Cason Cooley – piano, mellotron (tracks 3, 5, 7), bells (tracks 4, 6, 11), Rhodes piano (tracks 4 & 5), electric guitar (track 5)
Mark Polack – bass guitar
Will Sayles – drums, percussion

Additional musicians
Jordan Brooke Hamlin – French horn (tracks 1, 4, 6, 8, 10, 11), trumpet (tracks 4, 6, 10, 11)
David Henry – cello (tracks 1, 2, 6, 8, 9, 10, 11)
Sandra McCracken – vocals (track 9), acoustic guitar (track 5)

Technical
 Derek Webb – producer, additional engineer, design concept, direction
 Cason Cooley – producer
 Shane D. Wilson – engineer, mixing
 Peter Carlson – assistant engineer
 Sandra McCracken – additional engineer
 Jim DeMain – mastering
 Sumner Studio, Nashville, Tennessee – recording location* Cason Cooley – additional engineer
 Pentavarit – mixing location
 Yes Master, Nashville, Tennessee – mastering location
 Chris Richards – illustration for www.cerichards.net
 Wayne Brezinka – design, layout for www.brezinkadesign.com

Awards and accolades
Mockingbird was named the No. 7 "Best Christian Album of 2006" by Christianity Today magazine.

Charts

References

2005 albums
Albums free for download by copyright owner
Derek Webb albums